This is a list of current and past members from the Maharashtra Legislative Council State. The state elects members for a term of six years. 30 members are indirectly elected by the state legislators. 22 members are elected from Local Authorities Constituency, 7 from Graduates Constituency and 7 from Teachers Constituency. The Governor of Maharashtra nominated up to 12 members from eminent people from various fields.

Members of Maharashtra Legislative Council 
Alphabetical list by last name

The list is incomplete.
 Star (*) represents current members from MH State.
 MLA - Members of Legislative Assembly (of Maharashtra State)
 LA - Local Authorities
 GR - Graduates
 TA - Teachers
 NOM - Nominated by Governor of Maharashtra State

References

External links
 Maharashtra Legislature

 
Legislative Council
Lists of state legislators of Indian States